The 2020–21 Plunket Shield was the 92nd season of the Plunket Shield, the domestic first-class cricket competition in New Zealand. It started on 19 October 2020 and finished on 6 April 2021. Wellington were the defending champions.

On 15 June 2020, New Zealand Cricket announced the first round of contracts for domestic teams ahead of the 2020–21 season. The full schedule for the tournament was confirmed on 8 October 2020.

The season started on 19 October 2020, with the opening two matches affected by the weather, with them both ending early during the tea break on the first day. In the match between Auckland and Otago, Auckland's Benjamin Lister became the first COVID-19 replacement in a cricket match. Lister replaced Mark Chapman, who reported feeling unwell, inline with the updated International Cricket Council (ICC) playing conditions for a substitute due to COVID.

Canterbury won the tournament with two rounds of matches to play, winning their first title since the 2016–17 season.

Points table

 Champions

Fixtures

Round 1

Round 2

Round 3

Round 4

Round 5

Round 6

Round 7

Round 8

References

External links
 Series home at ESPN Cricinfo

Plunket Shield
2020–21 New Zealand cricket season
Plunket Shield